Tiara Andini Prastika (born 22 March 1996) is an Indonesian mountain cyclist. She represented Indonesia at the 2018 Asian Games and clinched an historic gold medal for Indonesia in the women's downhill cycling event. With this achievement, she also became the first Indonesian female cyclist to claim a gold medal in the mountain bike event in an Asian Games event.

Awards and nominations

References 

1996 births
Living people
Indonesian female cyclists
Cyclists at the 2018 Asian Games
Medalists at the 2018 Asian Games
Asian Games gold medalists for Indonesia
Asian Games medalists in cycling
Southeast Asian Games gold medalists for Indonesia
Southeast Asian Games silver medalists for Indonesia
Southeast Asian Games medalists in cycling
Competitors at the 2019 Southeast Asian Games
Competitors at the 2021 Southeast Asian Games
21st-century Indonesian women